John Thomas Goode (July 21, 1835 – April 3, 1916) was an American politician who served in the Virginia House of Delegates.

References

External links 

1835 births
1916 deaths
Democratic Party members of the Virginia House of Delegates
19th-century American politicians